Bacoor Bay is a large inlet of southeastern Manila Bay, situated within the province of Cavite in the Philippines.

Geography
Bacoor Bay lies along the shoreline of southeastern Cavite Peninsula.

Cavite City and Bacoor are along sections of its shore. The Governor Samonte Park View Promenade is a park along its northern shore in Cavite City.

The bay serves as the inner anchorage of Cavite Naval Base. Cañacao Bay is on the northeast of the base and the eastern Cavite City peninsula, and north of Bacoor Bay.

References

Webster's New Geographical Dictionary. Springfield, Massachusetts: Merriam-Webster, Inc., 1984. .

External links

Bays of the Philippines
Manila Bay
Landforms of Cavite
Bacoor
Cavite City